Christopher Malton  was a 16th century English priest.

Malton was educated at Christ Church, Oxford. He held livings at Holcot, Lilley, Maids Moreton and Sywell. He was Archdeacon of Cleveland from  1564 until his death on 24 March 1570.

References

Alumni of Christ Church, Oxford
Archdeacons of Cleveland
16th-century English people
1570 deaths